New Westminster—Coquitlam—Burnaby was a federal electoral district in British Columbia, Canada that was represented in the House of Commons of Canada from 1997 to 2004.

Geography
This was an urban riding that contained the city of New Westminster, and those parts of Burnaby lying southeast of the Trans-Canada Highway, and the southwestern portion of Coquitlam.

History
This riding was created in 1996 from parts of the electoral districts of New Westminster—Burnaby and Port Moody—Coquitlam.

This riding was used in the 1997 and 2000 federal elections.

In 2003, the district was abolished. Parts of it went into the electoral districts of New Westminster—Coquitlam, Burnaby—New Westminster and Burnaby—Douglas.

Member of Parliament

Election results

See also 

 List of Canadian federal electoral districts
 Past Canadian electoral districts

External links 
 Library of Parliament Riding Profile
 Expenditures - 2000
 Expenditures – 1997
 Website of the Parliament of Canada

Former federal electoral districts of British Columbia
Politics of Burnaby
Politics of Coquitlam
New Westminster